Charles Curtis (22 November 1910 – 1985) was a footballer who played in the Football League for Tranmere Rovers.

Career
Curtis was born in Sunderland and began his career as an amateur with Stoke City playing for the reserve side in the Central League during the 1933–34 season. He left at the end of the campaign to turn professional with Third Division North side Tranmere Rovers. He spent two seasons with Rovers playing 28 times before leaving for non-league football.

Career statistics
Source:

References

English footballers
1910 births
1985 deaths
Association football midfielders
English Football League players
Stoke City F.C. players
Tranmere Rovers F.C. players
Boston United F.C. players